Paul "Pauke" Meijers (2 June 193414 October 2013) was a Dutch football player.

Club career
A right winger, Meijers followed in his father Hendrik's footsteps and started his career at NEC Nijmegen, making his professional debut against Rigtersbleek in September 1954 and joined Feyenoord from De Graafschap in 1957 for a then Dutch record 55,000 Dutch guilders and went on to play 98 official games for the Rotterdammers. He also had spells at De Graafschap, NAC Breda and AGOVV.

International career
Meijers made his debut for the Netherlands in a September 1953 friendly match against Norway. It would end up as his only cap. He was the second player in NEC history to make the national team.

He also played for the Dutch army team.

Personal life and death
Meijers was the father of former Helmond Sport manager Eric Meijers.

Meijers suffered from Alzheimer's disease and died on 14 October 2013.

References

External links
 
 Career stats - Feyenoord
 NEC stats - NEC Archives

1934 births
2013 deaths
Footballers from Nijmegen
Association football wingers
Dutch footballers
Netherlands international footballers
Deaths from dementia in the Netherlands
Deaths from Alzheimer's disease
NEC Nijmegen players
De Graafschap players
Feyenoord players
NAC Breda players
AGOVV Apeldoorn players